Hyspaosines (also spelled Aspasine) was an Iranian prince, and the founder of Characene, a kingdom situated in southern Mesopotamia. He was originally a Seleucid satrap installed by king Antiochus IV Epiphanes, but declared independence in 141 BC after the collapse and subsequent transfer of Seleucid authority in Iran and Babylonia to the Parthians. Hyspaosines briefly occupied the Parthian city of Babylon in 127 BC, where he is recorded in records as king (šarru). In 124 BC, however, he was forced to acknowledge Parthian suzerainty. He died in the same year, and was succeeded by his juvenile son Apodakos.

Name and background 
Of Iranian descent, Hyspaosines' name is a Hellenized name of Persian or Bactrian origin, possibly derived from the Old Iranian vispa-čanah ("who appreciates all [things]"). Hyspaosines' father, Sagdodonacus, seemingly had a Bactrian name and was presumably of Bactrian origin himself. He had served the local dynasts (frataraka) of Persis, who had been able to reign independently for three decades from Greek Seleucid authority, and even briefly seize the region of Characene. The Seleucid ruler Antiochus IV Epiphanes eventually managed to re-establish Greek authority over Persis and Characene, and appointed his general Noumenios as the governor of Characene.

Governorship 

The capital of Characene, Alexandria, was originally founded by the Macedonian ruler Alexander the Great, with the intention of using the town as a leading commercial port for his eastern capital of Babylon. However, the city never lived up to its expectations, and was destroyed in the mid 3rd-century BC by floods. It was not until the reign of Antiochus IV Epiphanes that the city was rebuilt and renamed Antiochia. After the city was fully restored in 166/5 BC, Antiochus IV appointed Hyspaosines as governor (eparch) of Antiochia and its surroundings. 

During this period Antiochia briefly flourished, until Antiochus IV's premature death by disease in 163 BC, which weakened Seleucid authority throughout the empire. With the weakening of the Seleucids, many political entities within the empire declared independence, such as the neighbouring region of Characene, Elymais, which was situated in most of the present-day province of Khuzestan in southern Iran. Hyspaosines, although now a more or less independent ruler, remained a loyal subject of the Seleucids. Hyspaosines' keenness to remain as a Seleucid governor was possibly due to avoid interruption in the profitable trade between Antiochia and Seleucia.

Reign 
The Seleucids had suffered heavy defeats by the Iranian Parthian Empire; in 148/7 BC, the Parthian king Mithridates I conquered Media and Atropatene, and by 141 BC, was in the possession of Babylonia. The events are recorded in the Babylonian astronomical Diaries. The menace and proximity of the Parthians caused Hyspaosines to declare independence. In 127 BC, Mithridates I's son and successor Phraates II met an abrupt death during his war with the nomads in the east. Hyspaosines took advantage of the situation by seizing Babylon, which is attested in Babylonian records, where he is recorded as king (šarru). His rule over the city lasted briefly; at the start of November 127 BC, the Parthian general Timarchus recaptured it. 

Regardless, Hyspaosines' troops continued to plunder the Babylonian region as late as 126 BC. In 124 BC, however, Hyspaosines accepted Parthian suzerainty, and continued to rule Characene as a vassal. He corresponded with the Parthian general of Babylonia, informing him of the defeat of Elymais by the Parthian monarch Mithridates II. He also returned the wooden throne of Arsaces to the Parthians as a gift to the god Bel. The astronomical diaries report that the king became ill on 3 June 124 BC and died on 11 June 124 BC at the age of 85. His age is reported by 2nd century Roman historian Lucian, who provided a list of rulers who died in a very old age.

He was succeeded by his and queen Thalassia's juvenile son Apodakos. The Parthian commander Sindates was placed as the governor of Characene.

References

Bibliography

Ancient works 
 Pliny the Elder Natural History, VI 139
 Lucian, Macrobii.
 Astronomical Diaries (now in the British Museum and in a private collection. Following cuneiform texts refer to Hyspaosinesː British Museum nos 33461, 3386, 55070, 45699, 34274, 45708, 45693, 45853, 33024). They are published in Abraham Sachs, Hermann Hunger: Astronomical Diaries and Related Texts from Babylon, III, Diaries from 164 BC. to 61 B.C. Verlag der Österreichischen Akademie der Wissenschaften, Vienna 1996, pp. 216-282. The tablet in the private collection is published by T. G. Pinchesː Babylonian and Oriental Record, Vol. IV, London 1890, 131-141 online.

Modern works 
 
 
 
 
 
 
 .
 Galier, P.L.; P. Lombard, K.M. al-Sindi (2002): Greek Inscriptions from Bahrain, In: Arabian archaeology and epigraphy, 13, pp. 223-26 the Inscription from Bahrain (pdf)
 
 .

Further reading 
 
 
 

200s BC births
124 BC deaths
Ancient Mesopotamia
Seleucid satraps
2nd-century BC rulers in Asia
Kings of Characene
2nd-century BC Iranian people
2nd-century BC Babylonian kings